Baetodes adustus is a species of small minnow mayfly in the family Baetidae. It is found in Central America.

References

Mayflies
Articles created by Qbugbot
Insects described in 1972